Andrea Kreuzer (born 8 March 1984) is an Austrian former competitive figure skater. She is the 2006 Austrian national champion and competed in the final segment at two European Championships, finishing 23rd in 2005 (Turin) and 18th in 2006 (Lyon).

Kreuzer started skating at the age of five. She trained at the Cottage Engelmann Verein skating club.

Programs

Competitive highlights

References

External links

 

1984 births
Living people
Austrian female single skaters
Figure skaters from Vienna
Competitors at the 2005 Winter Universiade
Competitors at the 2011 Winter Universiade